George Sandby, D.D. (5 April 1716 – 24 March 1807) was an 18th-century English priest and academic.

Sandby was educated at Merton College, Oxford, matriculating in 1734 and graduating B.A. in 1737. He held livings at Denton and Skeyton. He was Master of Magdalene College, Cambridge  from 1760 until 1774; Vice-Chancellor of the University of Cambridge from 1760 until 1761; and Chancellor of the Diocese of Norwich from 1768 until his death.

References 

18th-century English Anglican priests
Vice-Chancellors of the University of Cambridge
Alumni of Merton College, Oxford
Masters of Magdalene College, Cambridge
1716 births
1807 deaths
People educated at Eton College
Diocese of Norwich